The reedhaunters are two species of marsh-dwelling Furnariid birds found in south-eastern Brazil, north-eastern Argentina and Uruguay. They occupy a similar ecological niche to some reed warblers. 

The two species are superficially similar, and often included in the same genus, Limnornis, but evidence suggests the straight-billed reedhaunter is closer to the Cranioleuca spinetails than it is to the curve-billed reedhaunter.

Species 
 Curve-billed reedhaunter (Limnornis curvirostris). 
 Straight-billed reedhaunter (Limnoctites rectirostris).

References 

Furnariidae